Edward, Ed or Eddie Williams may refer to:

Entertainment
Ed Williams (actor) (born 1926), American actor
Lil' Ed Williams (born 1955), American blues guitarist, singer and songwriter
Edward Williams (engraver) (c. 1755–1797?), English engraver
Edward Williams (painter) (1781–1855), English painter
Eddie Williams (saxophonist) (1910–1977), American musician
Eddie Williams (1912–1995), singer, see Johnny Moore's Three Blazers
Edward Williams (composer) (1921–2013), British composer
Edward Charles Williams (1807–1881), English landscape painter
Edward Christopher Williams (1871–1929), African-American librarian and author

Law
Edward Vaughan Williams (1797–1875), English judge
Edward Williams (Victorian judge) (1813–1880), judge from Victoria, Australia
Edward Bennett Williams (1920–1988), American lawyer and sports team owner
Edward Williams (Queensland judge) (1921–1999), judge from Queensland, Australia

Military
Edward Ellerker Williams (1793–1822), British Army officer
Edward Williams (British Army officer) (1892–1977), British Army officer and cricketer
Edward Thomas Williams (1901–1973), U.S. Army general
Edward Alexander Wilmot Williams (1910–1994), British general

Politics
Edward Williams (died c. 1594) (died 1590s), MP
Edward Williams (died 1721) (1659–1721), English politician, MP for Breconshire
Edward Williams (UK politician) (1890–1963), British politician and diplomat
Eddie Joe Williams (born 1954), American politician in Arkansas

Sports

American football
Ed Williams (running back) (born 1950), American football player for the Cincinnati Bengals and Tampa Bay Buccaneers
Edward Williams (American football) (born 1982), American football wide receiver
Eddie Williams (American football) (born 1987), American football fullback for the Washington Redskins and Chicago Bears

Other sports
Edward Williams (footballer) (fl. 1903–1905), soccer player
Edward Williams (rower) (1888–1915), British rower
Edward Williams (British Army officer) (1892–1977), English cricketer
Edward Williams (bowls) (born 1911), South African lawn bowler
Edward Williams (cricketer, born 1925) (1925–2013), English cricketer
Edward Williams (biathlete) (born 1942), American Olympic biathlete
Eddie Williams (baseball) (born 1964), American baseball player

Others
Iolo Morganwg (real name Edward Williams, 1747–1826), Welsh antiquarian
Edward Williams (iron-master) (1826-1886), iron-master and grandson of Iolo Morganwg
Edward Williams (businessman) (1843–1903), American businessman who co-founded Sherwin-Williams
Edward Williams (minister) (1750–1813), Welsh nonconformist minister, theological writer, and tutor
Edward Marsh Williams (1818–1908), missionary, interpreter, and judge
Edward H. Williams (1824–1899), American physician and railroad executive
Edward Leader Williams (1828–1910), English engineer
Edward E. Williams (1945–2018), American economist
Edward Wyckoff Williams (born 1978), African-American author and political and economic analyst 
Eddie Williams (activist) (1932–2017), black rights activist
Edward F. Williams (shipbuilder), American shipbuilder
Edward F. Williams (pilot boat), a 19th-century Sandy Hook pilot boat

See also
Ed Williams (disambiguation)
Edwin Williams (disambiguation)
Ted Williams (disambiguation)
Teddy Williams (disambiguation)